Hermann Patrick Kelly (born 1968) is an Irish political candidate and former journalist. In September 2018 he assisted in founding the far-right Irish Freedom Party, and is now president of the party. As of late 2021, Kelly was press officer for Romanian politician Cristian Terheș.

Early life and education
Kelly was born on Christmas Day, 1968 and is originally from the Bogside in Derry. His father was a headmaster of a primary school in Creggan, his mother was a nurse and he has three siblings.

His Secondary education was at St Columb's College, Derry.  He then studied marine biology in Edinburgh before studying theology as a lay student at St. Patrick's College, Maynooth. He briefly worked as a teacher in Dublin.

Writer

Journalism
As a journalist, Kelly was a contributing columnist to the Irish Examiner, and also wrote for the Irish Mail on Sunday. Following the resignation of editor Simon Rowe in mid-2004, Kelly was briefly acting editor (and later deputy editor) of The Irish Catholic.

Kathy O'Beirne book
In 2007, Kelly wrote a book titled Kathy's Real Story which disputed the claims made in a book by Kathy O'Beirne (Don't Ever Tell), in which O'Beirne described childhood abuse she had reputedly suffered in a Magdalene asylum. Kelly claimed that initial doubts that he had while reading her book were confirmed by inconsistencies in different accounts which O'Beirne had given, and later confirmed by various witnesses and documentary evidence. He also claimed that false allegations were being made by those appearing before the Residential Institutions Redress Board in order to receive compensation.

A review by Gene Kerrigan (who worked alongside Michael Sheridan, O'Beirne's co-author) criticised Kelly's own criticism of O'Beirne's book. Kelly and O'Beirne both appeared on Ireland AM to discuss their books in November 2007, and the encounter ended in an argument.

Kelly also wrote to the proposed publishers of a sequel by O'Beirne, sending them a copy of Kathy's Real Story and asking them not to publish. A Sunday Times article of July 2009 indicated that the publisher had withdrawn their initial offer to publish her book because of an "unresolved legal issue".

European Union politics
Kelly was formerly a press officer for Nigel Farage, and the director of communications for Europe of Freedom and Direct Democracy (EFDD), of which Farage was co-president. The EFDD  dissolved in mid-2019.

Kelly, who is from Northern Ireland in the United Kingdom, supports Ireland leaving the European Union (an 'Irexit'), and is the President of the Irish Freedom Party, a party that advocates the same position. He contested the 2019 European Parliament election in the Dublin constituency, receiving 2,441 (0.67%) first preference votes and was eliminated on the fourth count.

As of 2021 Kelly was serving as press officer to Romanian MEP Cristian Terheș of the European Conservatives and Reformists group, who has consistently declined to show an EU Digital COVID Certificate or proof of testing upon entering the European Parliament.

Political views
Kelly advocates for Ireland to leave the European Union and for a united Ireland. In a 2019 interview, he said: "It's not just about leaving the EU, it's about more basic things. It's about freedom of speech, something that's under attack in Ireland, it’s about encouraging work, encouraging families and encouraging people to have children". Kelly is fiscally conservative, and has questioned the financial cost of Ireland's EU contributions.

His party, the Irish Freedom Party, is anti-abortion, pro-natalist and "supportive of stable families for procreation". Kelly has described his views as representing "Irish Catholic nationalism".

He described State redress for victims of institutional abuse as "a State-sponsored ATM machine".

Some outlets have linked Kelly with alt-right ideologies, pointing to a YouTube interview in which Kelly appeared alongside far-right British Loyalist and former British National Party member Jim Dowson. In the video Kelly stated that "[they want to] kill Irish kids and [..] replace them with every nationality who wants to come into our country", a statement which several news outlets associated with the white nationalist "great replacement" conspiracy theory. This followed a similar interview, in January 2019 with LifeSiteNews, in which Kelly denounced what he called the "great replacement of our children". In a 2019 Twitter post, Kelly stated that "those talking about a Great Replacement in Ireland have a point". Later in 2019, Kelly stated that, before an Irish government could make policy changes which result in "population increases [..] immigration or otherwise, it must first consult the people of Ireland". He used the phrase "abort and import" to describe Sinn Féin immigration policy. In interviews and Twitter posts, Kelly has stated that he does not support the idea of separate races or racial superiority, while also advocating for a "mono cultural society".

Kelly has spoken in favour of free speech, and during 2020 he called for an end to the controls in place to address the COVID-19 pandemic in Ireland.

References

1968 births
Alumni of St Patrick's College, Maynooth
Business Post people
Irish eurosceptics
Irish newspaper editors
Journalists from Northern Ireland
Living people
Magill people
Male non-fiction writers from Northern Ireland
Media coverage of Catholic Church sexual abuse scandals
People educated at St Columb's College
Sunday Independent (Ireland) people